Nohra is a village and a former municipality in the district of Nordhausen, in Thuringia, Germany. As of 2018, Nohra had a population of 799.

Nohra was first mentioned on 9 January 1152.

Since 1 January 2019, it is part of the town of Bleicherode.

References

Nordhausen (district)
Former municipalities in Thuringia